This page provides supplementary chemical data on barium nitrate.

Material Safety Data Sheet  

The handling of this chemical may incur notable safety precautions. It is highly recommend that you seek the Material Safety Datasheet (MSDS) for this chemical from a reliable source  and follow its directions.
SIRI
MSDS from BARIUM AND CHEMICALS INC in the SDSdata.org database
Science Stuff

Structure and properties

Thermodynamic properties

Spectral data

References 

Chemical data pages
Chemical data pages cleanup